David Scott Bernsley (דייוויד ברנסלי; born May 6, 1969) is an American-Israeli former basketball player. He played the forward and center positions. He played in the Israeli Basketball Premier League, and for the Israeli national basketball team. He later became an educator and a high school principal.

Early and personal life
Bernsley is a native of Monroe, New York, and is 6' 7" (201 cm) tall. His parents are Harvey and Valerie Bernsley. He and his wife Karen have five children, and live in Montgomery, New York.

Basketball career
He attended Monroe-Woodbury High School ('87), and played basketball for the school team.

For college Bernsley first attended the University of Rhode Island. He played basketball for the Rhode Island Rams in 1987–88.

Bernsley then attended Manhattan College (Bachelor's degree; '92). He played for the Manhattan Jaspers in 1989–92. In 1991–92 he was 8th in the Metro Atlantic Athletic Conference in blocks, with 27, and 9th in rebounds, with 213. In 1992 he was named to the MAAC All-Championship Team.

He played in the Israeli Basketball Premier League for Hapoel Jerusalem, Maccabi Givat Shmuel, Maccabi Kiryat Motzkin, and Ironi Ramat Gan.

Bernsley also played for the Israeli national basketball team. He competed in the 1997 FIBA European Championship for Men.

Educator career
He earned a master’s degree from Iona College, and a Certificate of Advanced Study from SUNY New Paltz ('04). Bernsley taught at Harry S. Truman High School in the Bronx, and at North Rockland High School in Thiells, New York, in Rockland County. He then served as assistant principal at Washingtonville High School. From 2005 to 2010 he was the Principal at Wallkill Senior High School in Wallkill, New York.

In 2010 Bernsley became the Principal of Monroe-Woodbury High School. He served as Principal of the Edmund J. O'Neal Middle School of Excellence in Albany, New York until his unexpected resignation in June of 2021.

References

External links
Twitter page

1969 births
Living people
American men's basketball players
Basketball players from New York (state)
Centers (basketball)
Hapoel Jerusalem B.C. players
Iona University alumni
Ironi Ramat Gan players
Israeli Basketball Premier League players
Israeli men's basketball players
Maccabi Givat Shmuel players
Manhattan Jaspers basketball players
People from Monroe, New York
Power forwards (basketball)
Rhode Island Rams men's basketball players
Schoolteachers from New York (state)
State University of New York at New Paltz alumni